is a Japanese electric organist from Fukui Prefecture. Her 2019 debut album, DEPARTURE, and her 2020 follow-up, possible, have both charted on the Oricon Albums Chart.

Early life
826aska hails from Sabae, Fukui Prefecture. She began to play piano at the age of five. She began to play electric organ at the age of eight and post videos of her performance on YouTube.

Career
On December 31, 2015, 826aska posted a YouTube video of her performing a Star Wars theme medley on the electric organ. The video went viral, earning over one million views in less than a month and garnering media attention for 826aska.

After that, she appeared in Japanese TV programs Miyaneya in May 2016 and Nakai kun no manabu switch hosted by Masahiro Nakai in September 2018.

826aska released her debut album, DEPARTURE, in March 2019. Continuing from the previous year, she went on a nation-wide tour in 2019.

Discography

Albums

References 

Japanese women organists
People from Sabae, Fukui
Musicians from Fukui Prefecture
2001 births
Living people
21st-century Japanese women musicians
Japanese YouTubers